Vikram Talwar is an Indian businessman. He is now retired from the firm he co-founded and worked at for almost 15 years, EXL Service.

In 1970, Vikram obtained his M.B.A.(Postgraduation degree) from Indian Institute of Management (IIM), Ahmedabad, India. At the age of 25, Vikram migrated to San Francisco, United States, and worked for Bank of America (BOA) in various capacities in nine countries in Asia, including as a Country Manager in India from 1970 to 1996.  At BOA, Vikram was among the youngest senior Vice Presidents of the bank in 1991.

After 26 years of service with the bank, he worked as chief executive officer and managing director at Ernst & Young in India from 1998 to 1999. He quit Ernst & Young to start his own firm Exl Service Holdings, Inc., with Rohit Kapoor, a colleague from Bank of America in April 1999.

From the inception of his own firm, he served at his company in various capacities—as a Chief Executive Officer from April 1999; as Chief Executive Officer and Vice Chairman of company's board of directors from November 2002 to April 2008; as Executive Chairman from May 2008 till April 2011; and as a Chairman from April 2011 to February 2014.

In an interview to Sudhir Chowdhary, a The Financial Express correspondent, he says "one is never too old to embark on a new adventure in life," and further adds:

Awards
He won the Metro New York Ernst & Young Entrepreneur of the Year for Business Services in 2008.

References

External links
 Committee Composition - Chairman of the Board:Vikram Talwar

1949 births
Indian chief executives
Businesspeople from Ahmedabad
Living people